Achilles Pirmin Gasser (3 November 1505 – 4 December 1577) was a German physician and astrologer. He is now known as a well-connected humanistic scholar, and supporter of both Copernicus and Rheticus.

Life
Born in Lindau, he studied mathematics, history and philosophy as well as astronomy. He was a student in Sélestat under Johannes Sapidus; he also attended universities in Wittenberg, Vienna, Montpellier, and Avignon.

In 1528, German cartographer Sebastian Münster appealed to scientists across the Holy Roman Empire to assist him with his description of Germany. Gassar accepted this and was later recognized by Münster as a close collaborator for his cartography of the country.

Rheticus lost his physician father Georg Iserin in 1528, executed on sorcery charges. Gasser later took over the practice in Feldkirch, in 1538; he taught Rheticus some astrology, and helped his education, in particular by writing to the University of Wittenberg on his behalf.

When Rheticus printed his Narratio prima—the first published account of the Copernican heliocentric system—in 1540 (Danzig), he sent Gasser a copy. Gasser then undertook a second edition (1541, Basel) with his own introduction, in the form of a letter from Gasser to Georg Vogelin of Konstanz. The second edition (1566, Basel) of De revolutionibus orbium coelestium contained the Narratio Prima with this introduction by Gasser.

Gasser died in Augsburg, leaving over 2,900 literary works that are now stored at the Vatican Library in Rome.

Works

He prepared the first edition (Augsburg, 1558) of the Epistola de magnete of Pierre de Maricourt.

Other works include:
Historiarum et Chronicorum totius mundi epitome (1532)
Prognosticon (1544) dedicated to Thomas Venatorius
Edition of the Evangelienbuch of Otfried of Weissenburg. His edition did not appear until 1571, under the name of Matthias Flacius who had taken over.
Observations on comets 

Gasser belonged with Flacius to the humanist circle around Kaspar von Niedbruck, concerned with the recovery of monastic manuscripts. Others in the group were John Bale, Conrad Gesner, Joris Cassander, Johannes Matalius Metellus, and Cornelius Wauters.

Notes

References
Jack Repcheck (2007), Copernicus' Secret: How the Scientific Revolution Began
Karl Galle, Scientist of the Day - Achilles Pirmin Gasser

Further reading
Karl Heinz Burmeister (1970), Achilles Pirmin Gasser, 1505-1577. Arzt u. Naturforscher, Historiker und Humanist. (3 volumes.)
 Karl Heinz Burmeister, Achilles Pirmin Gasser (1505-1577) as Geographer and Cartographer, Imago Mundi Vol. 24, (1970), pp. 57–62; https://www.jstor.org/stable/1150458

External links
 :de:s:ADB:Gasser, Achilles Pirminius
CERL page
 Old dictionary entry

1505 births
1577 deaths
16th-century German physicians
German astrologers
16th-century astrologers
German Renaissance humanists
16th-century German writers
16th-century German male writers